Maximum power can refer to:
 Maximum power transfer theorem in electronics
 Maximum power principle in systems theory
 Maximum power point tracking in energy extraction, most commonly photovoltaic solar systems

See also
 Max Power (disambiguation)